These are the results of the diving competition at the 1982 World Aquatics Championships, which took place in Guayaquil, Ecuador.

Medal table

Medal summary

Men

Women

1982 World Aquatics Championships
Diving at the World Aquatics Championships